The Sušica camp was a concentration and detention camp set up by Serb forces for Bosniaks and other non-Serbs in the Vlasenica municipality in eastern Bosnia and Herzegovina.

The camp
The camp comprised two main buildings and a small house. The detainees were housed in a hangar which measured approximately 30 by 50 meters. Between late May and October 1992, as many as 8,000 Bosniak civilians and other non-Serbs from Vlasenica and the surrounding villages were successively detained in the hangar at Sušica camp. The number of detainees in the hangar at any one time was usually between 300 and 500. The building was severely overcrowded and living conditions were deplorable.

Men, women and children were detained at the camp, sometimes entire families. Women and children as young as eight years old were usually detained for short periods of time and then forcibly transferred to nearby Muslim areas. The men were held in the camp until its closure in late September 1992, and were then transferred to the larger Batković concentration camp near the town of Bijeljina. Women of all ages were raped or sexually assaulted during their time in the camp by camp guards or other men who were allowed to enter the camp.

Male detainees of the camp suffered a similar fate as the women. They were bullied, tortured and
murdered. According to Pero Popović, a former guard at the camp, they were generally lined up against an electricity pylon just outside the barracks and shot. Detainees at Sušica performed forced labour, sometimes at the front lines. Some detainees were killed by camp guards or died from mistreatment. A massacre was committed during the night of 30 September 1992, when the remaining 140 to 150 detainees at Sušica camp were driven out of the camp with buses and executed.

War crime verdict

Dragan Nikolić, the commander of the camp, pleaded guilty to crimes against humanity and was sentenced to 20 years imprisonment. Predrag Bastah and Goran Višković were sentenced to 22 years and 18 years of imprisonment, respectively, for their involvement at the Sušica camp.

See also
Bosnian Genocide
Dretelj camp
Gabela camp
Heliodrom camp
Keraterm camp
Manjača camp
Omarska camp
Trnopolje camp
Uzamnica camp
Vilina Vlas

References

1992 establishments in Bosnia and Herzegovina
1992 disestablishments in Bosnia and Herzegovina
Serbian concentration camps in the Yugoslav Wars
Bosnian War internment camps
Serbian war crimes in the Bosnian War